The Helo Cliffs are a set of cliffs at about  on the north rim of the summit caldera of Mount Erebus, on Ross Island, Antarctica. The name derives from a nearby U.S. Coast Guard HH-52A helicopter (CG 1404) which crashed on the east slope of Mount Erebus while en route to Cape Bird from McMurdo Station on January 9, 1971. The helicopter lost power in flight and was damaged when it landed. The four crew and passengers were not injured. The helicopter was abandoned because of its location (U.S. Navy Task Force 43, 1971).

References

Cliffs of Ross Island